Fleury ( or ;), unofficially Fleury-d'Aude for disambiguation, is a commune in the Aude department, in the administrative region of Occitania, southern France.

Population

See also
Communes of the Aude department

References

Communes of Aude
Aude communes articles needing translation from French Wikipedia